Karapet "Karo" Parisyan (born August 28, 1982) is an Armenian-American mixed martial artist, who last competed in the welterweight division. A professional MMA competitor since 1999, Parisyan is a former WEC Welterweight Champion and has also competed for the UFC, Bellator, and Impact FC.

Background
Parisyan was born in Yerevan, Armenian SSR (today Armenia). His family migrated to America when he was six years old. Parisyan started training in judo when he was nine years old under fellow Armenian Gokor Chivichyan. Parisyan stated that his father began taking him to judo lessons because he beat up on his sisters and judo would be an effective outlet for Parisyan to take out his anger. In a book he published, however, Parisyan wrote that his father introduced him to judo to cure his laziness. By age ten, Parisyan was training his Judo under both Chivichyan and Gene LeBell.

Mixed martial arts career

Hayastan Grappling System
For more than thirteen years, Parisyan developed under the Hayastan Grappling System (aka Hayastan Wrestling), a style developed by Gokor Chivichyan and Gene LeBell, which blends elements of Judo, Sambo, Catch wrestling, Greco-Roman wrestling and Freestyle wrestling. Parisyan continued to train at the Hayastan Academy under Gokor and Gene until late 2005. In early 2012, Karo mentioned in an interview that he has returned to the Hayastan Academy.

Judo
Parisyan has six Junior National belts to his credit and competed in the Olympic Judo trials ahead of the 2004 games in Athens. He wrote that going to the Olympics was his dream and that mixed martial arts was only an outlet for his boredom. During the trials, he received a call from UFC management and was invited to compete. He accepted because he needed money. But after the fight against Dave Strasser, his ribs needed recovery and he decided to give up on the trials.

He lost his first fight to Sean Sherk by a controversial decision. In an immediate rematch, Parisyan was unable to come out of his corner, and later explained he had been suffering from a stomach virus.

Ultimate Fighting Championship
Parisyan made his UFC debut on September 23, 2003, beating Dave Strasser by kimura. In his next fight, Parisyan fought Georges St-Pierre and lost via unanimous decision. During the fight, Parisyan attempted two kimuras, however Parisyan failed to secure them as St-Pierre defended both attempts. Parisyan became the first fighter to go the distance with St-Pierre. He then went on to win the WEC welterweight title, defeating Shonie Carter. He then returned to the UFC, where he won consecutive decision victories over Nick Diaz, Chris Lytle and Matt Serra.

Parisyan's next fight was to take place at UFC 56: Full Force, where he would challenge UFC Welterweight Champion Matt Hughes. However, Parysian suffered a hamstring injury and was forced to pull out. Joe Riggs took his place.

He next fought Nick Thompson at UFC 59 and won via submission (strikes) in the first round.

Parisyan then fought Diego Sanchez at UFC Fight Night 6. He lost via unanimous decision. The fight was chosen as the 2006 Fight of the Year by Wrestling Observer Newsletter.

Following the loss to Sanchez, Parisyan won three consecutive victories over Drew Fickett, Josh Burkman and Ryo Chonan, all via unanimous decision.

Parisyan lost via TKO to Thiago Alves at UFC Fight Night 13 in the second round. Alves showed good resistance against Parisyan's grappling offense and finished Parisyan with a knee from the clinch, followed by strikes.

Parisyan was scheduled to fight Yoshiyuki Yoshida at UFC 88: Breakthrough, but a back injury forced him to drop out of the fight right before the weigh-ins.

After recovering from his back injury, Parisyan returned at UFC 94 on January 31, 2009 in Las Vegas against Dong Hyun Kim. Parisyan defeated Kim in a controversial split decision. Following the fight, Parisyan tested positive for banned painkillers hydrocodone, hydromorphone and oxymorphone. Parisyan has stated that he has a prescription for the medications due to a severe back / hamstring injury. Parisyan was suspended pending a full hearing in mid-March. On March 17, 2009, the NSAC suspended Parisyan for nine months and ruled his decision victory a "no contest".

Parisyan was scheduled to fight Dustin Hazelett at UFC 106, but pulled out of the fight on November 19, the day before weigh-ins. UFC President Dana White responded to the situation on his Twitter stating that Parisyan will "not be fighting Saturday or ever again in the UFC!!" White also stated that he had "a laundry list of excuses." Later that day, Neil Melanson, a longtime friend and training partner of Parisyan's, divulged to MMA news site Five Ounces Of Pain that Parisyan has been battling an addiction to painkillers dating back to an injury suffered while training for a fight.

Post-UFC
Parisyan entered into talks with Strikeforce, looking to continue his mixed martial arts career in the USA, but it proved unsuccessful.

Parisyan's return fight took place on July 10, 2010 for Impact FC 1. He was initially scheduled to face Luis Dutra Jr., but Dutra would end up being forced off the card with a torn bicep. Parisyan's new opponent was Ben Mortimer, who Parisyan would go on to defeat via rear-naked choke at 4:18 of the second round.

Return to the UFC
On September 2, 2010, it was announced that Karo would be returning to the UFC. He faced Dennis Hallman at UFC 123 in November. Hallman defeated Parisyan via TKO due to punches at 1:47 in the first round. In a discussion with journalist Ariel Helwani following UFC 123, UFC President Dana White stated he believes Parisyan is through fighting in the UFC.

Independent promotions
Karo fought highly touted Canadian prospect Ryan Ford on May 19, 2011 in the MMA Live 1 show in London, Ontario, Canada. He was able to neutralize Ford's strength and power by applying his takedowns, as it seemed that the first and second rounds were in favor of Parisyan, but was caught in the third round by a vicious knee to the head which resulted in a cut over Karo's left eye that would end the fight via TKO due to a doctor's stoppage.

Parisyan fought Jordan Smith on September 14 in Brazil, Amazon Forest Combat 1. After a long hard battle going the distance, Parisyan came up short, losing the fight by split decision.

He was expected to fight Dave Menne on March 31, 2012, but Menne was forced out of the bout with an injury. Parisyan instead fought Thomas Denny. He won via unanimous decision.

Parisyan was scheduled to fight Shamar Bailey in the main event of ShoFIGHT 20 in Springfield, Missouri for the vacant welterweight title on June 16, 2012. However, Bailey was forced off the card due to an injury and replaced by fellow UFC veteran John Gunderson. After being stunned by a knee from Gunderson, which resulted in a broken cheek bone, Parisyan was caught in a guillotine choke and lost the fight by submission. Parisyan said after the fight that he tapped due to the pressure on his cheekbone and he wasn't being choked.

Parisyan was expected to fight David Bielkheden in Malmo, Sweden on October 6, 2012 but pulled out of the fight due to personal reasons and was replaced by Marcus Davis. Parisyan said at the time: "Everyone knows that it has been a rough road for me over the past couple years. I've tried to just refocus myself and get back to throwing people on their heads, but it hasn't been the same. Not to take anything away from my opponent, but my last fight was devastating for me. My manager and I had a long talk, and he set me up with a sports psychologist. At this point, I need to listen to my doctor and refocus on my life -- not fighting. God willing, fighting will be back in my life at some point, but for now I need to only focus on Karo getting back to Karo."

Parisyan defeated Tiger Bonds via first round armbar on September 29, 2012 at a Gladiator Challenge event.

Parisyan then fought on October 28, 2012 against Edward Darby and won via first round armbar.

Bellator MMA
Parisyan's first Bellator fight was against fellow judoka Rick Hawn at Bellator 95. Parisyan and Hawn had faced off twice in judo competitions previously, with Hawn winning both their matches at the Judo U.S. Open. In their Bellator bout, Parisyan lost via TKO in the second round.

Parisyan was expected to face Fight Master competitor Cristiano Souza at Bellator 106, but pulled out due to injury.

Parisyan faced Ron Keslar on April 11, 2014 at Bellator 116. He won the fight via knockout in the second round, marking the first KO victory of his MMA career.

Parisyan faced Bellator newcomer and former sparring partner Phil Baroni on July 25, 2014 at Bellator 122. He won the fight by TKO in the first round.

Parisyan was expected to face Marius Žaromskis at Bellator 127 on October 3, 2014. However, Žaromskis was pulled from the bout to fight at another date. Fernando Gonzalez stepped in as a replacement. Parisyan lost the fight via TKO in the first round. However, Gonzalez later failed a drug test and was subsequently fined and given a one-month suspension.

Championships and accomplishments

Mixed martial arts
World Extreme Cagefighting
WEC Welterweight Championship (One time)
Wrestling Observer Newsletter
2006 Fight of the Year vs. Diego Sanchez on August 17

Submission grappling
Judo
Black Belt in Judo under Gokor Chivichyan and Gene LeBell
Judo International Champion (4)
Junior National Champion (6)
Pan American Judo Silver Medalist
Brazilian Jiu-Jitsu
Black Belt in Brazilian Jiu-Jitsu
BJJ National Champion

Mixed martial arts record

|-
| Loss
| align=center| 24–12 (1)
| Jose Diaz
| TKO (retirement)
| Extreme Fighters MMA: Ready for War
| 
| align=center| 1
| align=center| 5:00
| Long Beach, California, United States
| 
|-
| Loss
| align=center| 24–11 (1)
| Fernando Gonzalez
| TKO (punches)
| Bellator 127
| 
| align=center| 1
| align=center| 1:43
| Temecula, California, United States
| Gonzalez tested positive for banned substance. However result was not changed to "No Contest." 
|-
| Win
| align=center| 24–10 (1)
| Phil Baroni
| TKO (punches)
| Bellator 122
| 
| align=center| 1
| align=center| 2:06
| Temecula, California, United States
| 
|-
| Win
| align=center| 23–10 (1)
| Ron Keslar
| TKO (punches)
| Bellator 116
| 
| align=center| 2
| align=center| 4:05
| Temecula, California, United States
| 
|-
| Loss
| align=center| 22–10 (1)
| Rick Hawn
| KO (punches)
| Bellator 95
| 
| align=center| 2
| align=center| 1:55
| Atlantic City, New Jersey, United States
| 
|-
| Win
| align=center| 22–9 (1)
| Edward Darby
| Submission (armbar)
| Gladiator Challenge: Heat Returns
| 
| align=center| 1
| align=center| 2:10
| San Jacinto, California, United States
| 
|-
| Win
| align=center| 21–9 (1)
| Tiger Bonds
| Submission (armbar)
| Gladiator Challenge: King Of The Mountain
| 
| align=center| 1
| align=center| 1:03
| San Diego, California, United States
| 
|-
| Loss
| align=center| 20–9 (1)
| John Gunderson
| Submission (guillotine choke)
| ShoFight 20
| 
| align=center| 1
| align=center| 2:47
| Springfield, Missouri, United States
| For vacant ShoFIGHT Welterweight Championship.
|-
| Win
| align=center| 20–8 (1)
| Thomas Denny
| Decision (unanimous)
| WMMA 1 - Fighting for a Better World
| 
| align=center| 3
| align=center| 5:00
| El Paso, Texas, United States
| 
|-
| Loss
| align=center| 19–8 (1)
| Jordan Smith
| Decision (split)
| Amazon Forest Combat 1
| 
| align=center| 3
| align=center| 5:00
| Manaus, Brazil
| 
|-
| Loss
| align=center| 19–7 (1)
| Ryan Ford
| TKO (doctor stoppage)
| JEG - MMA Live 1
| 
| align=center| 3
| align=center| 1:26
| London, Ontario, Canada
| 
|-
| Loss
| align=center| 19–6 (1)
| Dennis Hallman
| TKO (punches)
| UFC 123: Rampage vs. Machida
| 
| align=center| 1
| align=center| 1:47
| Auburn Hills, Michigan, United States
| 
|-
| Win
| align=center| 19–5 (1)
| Ben Mortimer
| Submission (rear-naked choke)
| Impact FC 1: The Uprising
| 
| align=center| 2
| align=center| 4:18
| Brisbane, Australia
| 
|-
| NC
| align=center| 18–5 (1)
| Dong Hyun Kim
| NC (overturned by NSAC)
| UFC 94: St-Pierre vs. Penn 2
| 
| align=center| 3
| align=center| 5:00
| Las Vegas, Nevada, United States
| Original split decision win; failed post-fight drug test for banned painkillers.
|-
| Loss
| align=center| 18–5
| Thiago Alves
| TKO (knee and punches)
| UFC Fight Night 13
| 
| align=center| 2
| align=center| 0:34
| Broomfield, Colorado, United States
| 
|-
| Win
| align=center| 18–4
| Ryo Chonan
| Decision (unanimous)
| UFC 78: Validation
| 
| align=center| 3
| align=center| 5:00
| Newark, New Jersey, United States
| 
|-
| Win
| align=center| 17–4
| Josh Burkman
| Decision (unanimous)
| UFC 71: Liddell vs. Jackson
| 
| align=center| 3
| align=center| 5:00
| Las Vegas, Nevada, United States
| 
|-
| Win
| align=center| 16–4
| Drew Fickett
| Decision (unanimous)
| UFC Fight Night: Sanchez vs. Riggs
| 
| align=center| 3
| align=center| 5:00
| San Diego, California, United States
| 
|-
| Loss
| align=center| 15–4
| Diego Sanchez
| Decision (unanimous)
| UFC Fight Night 6
| 
| align=center| 3
| align=center| 5:00
| Las Vegas, Nevada, United States
| 2006 Fight of the Year. Fight of the Night.
|-
| Win
| align=center| 15–3
| Nick Thompson
| TKO (submission to punches)
| UFC 59: Reality Check
| 
| align=center| 1
| align=center| 4:44
| Anaheim, California, United States
| 
|-
| Win
| align=center| 14–3
| Matt Serra
| Decision (unanimous)
| UFC 53: Heavy Hitters
| 
| align=center| 3
| align=center| 5:00
| Atlantic City, New Jersey, United States
| 
|-
| Win
| align=center| 13–3
| Chris Lytle
| Decision (unanimous)
| UFC 51: Super Saturday
| 
| align=center| 3
| align=center| 5:00
| Las Vegas, Nevada, United States
| 
|-
| Win
| align=center| 12–3
| Nick Diaz
| Decision (split)
| UFC 49: Unfinished Business
| 
| align=center| 3
| align=center| 5:00
| Las Vegas, Nevada, United States
| 
|-
| Win
| align=center| 11–3
| Shonie Carter
| Decision (unanimous)
| WEC 10 - Bragging Rights
| 
| align=center| 3
| align=center| 5:00
| Lemoore, California, United States
| Won WEC Welterweight Championship.
|-
| Loss
| align=center| 10–3
| Georges St-Pierre
| Decision (unanimous)
| UFC 46: Supernatural
| 
| align=center| 3
| align=center| 5:00
| Las Vegas, Nevada, United States
| 
|-
| Win
| align=center| 10–2
| Dave Strasser
| Submission (kimura)
| UFC 44: Undisputed
| 
| align=center| 1
| align=center| 3:52
| Las Vegas, Nevada, United States
| 
|-
| Win
| align=center| 9–2
| Fernando Vasconcelos
| Decision (unanimous)
| King of the Cage 22
| 
| align=center| 3
| align=center| 5:00
| San Jacinto, California, United States
| 
|-
| Win
| align=center| 8–2
| Antonio McKee
| Decision (unanimous)
| Ultimate Cage Fighting 3
| 
| align=center| 3
| align=center| 5:00
| Hollywood, California, United States
| 
|-
| Win
| align=center| 7–2
| Darrell Smith
| Submission (armbar)
| Reality Submission Fighting 3
| 
| align=center| 1
| align=center| 0:59
| Belleville, Illinois, United States
| 
|-
| Loss
| align=center| 6–2
| Sean Sherk
| TKO (corner stoppage)
| Reality Submission Fighting 2
| 
| align=center| 1
| align=center| 16:20
| Belleville, Illinois, United States
| 
|-
| Loss
| align=center| 6–1
| Sean Sherk
| Decision (unanimous)
| Reality Submission Fighting 1
| 
| align=center| 1
| align=center| 18:00
| Belleville, Illinois, United States
| 
|-
| Win
| align=center| 6–0
| Guido Jennings
| Submission (choke)
| Kage Kombat 16
| 
| align=center| 1
| align=center| 6:33
| California, United States
| 
|-
| Win
| align=center| 5–0
| Justin Bumphus
| Submission (choke)
| ESF: Empire One
| 
| align=center| 1
| align=center| N/A
| Corona, California, United States
| 
|-
| Win
| align=center| 4–0
| Scott Davis
| Submission (armbar)
| Kage Kombat 14
| 
| align=center| 1
| align=center| 2:16
| Los Angeles, California, United States
| 
|-
| Win
| align=center| 3–0
| Jason Rittgers
| Submission (armbar)
| Kage Kombat 14
| 
| align=center| 1
| align=center| 1:58
| Los Angeles, California, United States
| 
|-
| Win
| align=center| 2–0
| Zach McKinney
| Submission (armbar)
| Kage Kombat 12
| 
| align=center| 1
| align=center| 0:23
| Los Angeles, California, United States
| 
|-
| Win
| align=center| 1–0
| Brian Warren
| Submission (ankle lock)
| Kage Kombat 12
| 
| align=center| 1
| align=center| 0:44
| Los Angeles, California, United States
|

See also
List of male mixed martial artists

References

External links
 

1982 births
Living people
Sportspeople from Yerevan
Soviet emigrants to the United States
Armenian male judoka
Armenian male mixed martial artists
American male mixed martial artists
Mixed martial artists utilizing judo
Mixed martial artists utilizing sambo
Mixed martial artists utilizing catch wrestling
Mixed martial artists utilizing Brazilian jiu-jitsu
Welterweight mixed martial artists
Mixed martial artists from California
World Extreme Cagefighting champions
Doping cases in mixed martial arts
Ultimate Fighting Championship male fighters
American practitioners of Brazilian jiu-jitsu
Armenian practitioners of Brazilian jiu-jitsu
People awarded a black belt in Brazilian jiu-jitsu
Ethnic Armenian sportspeople